Christ the King School may refer to:

Christ the King Catholic High School, Preston, Lancashire, England
Christ the King Catholic High School, Southport, Merseyside, England
Christ the King High School (Antigua), St. John's, Antigua and Barbuda
Christ The King Elementary School, Brantford, Ontario, Canada
Christ the King Sixth Form College, London, England
Christ the King School of Cavite, Philippines

United States 
Christ the King Cathedral School, Lubbock, Texas
Christ the King Catholic High School (North Carolina)
Christ the King Catholic School (Dallas, Texas), a Texas Association parochial school

Christ the King Catholic School (Oklahoma City, Oklahoma)
Christ the King Catholic School (Pleasant Hill, California)
Christ the King Catholic School (Tampa, Florida), a school in Hillsborough County, Florida

Christ the King Preparatory School (New Jersey)
Christ the King Regional High School, Queens, New York
Christ the King School (Atlanta, Georgia)
Christ the King Catholic School (Tampa, Florida)